Shane Casey (born 1980) is an Irish actor and playwright. He is best known for playing the role of Billy Murphy in The Young Offenders (film) and The Young Offenders (TV).

Early life
Casey grew up in Cork City. He dropped out of school aged 16.

Career
Aged 21, Casey decided to give up his position as an apprentice painter/decorator and become an actor.

Casey appeared in 2006 in The Wind That Shakes the Barley. His major breakthrough came in 2016, playing Billy Murphy in the film The Young Offenders. In 2018 it was rebooted as a TV series, The Young Offenders, and Casey reprised his role.

He has written a play, Wet Paint, that has played at the Cork Opera House, Cork Arts Theatre and Everyman Palace Theatre. Casey is also an experienced stage actor.

References

External links
Official page

Male actors from Cork (city)
21st-century Irish male actors
Living people
1980 births
21st-century Irish dramatists and playwrights
Irish male dramatists and playwrights